Jonathan Grout (July 23, 1737  – September 8, 1807) was a member of the United States House of Representatives from Massachusetts.  Grout was born in Lunenburg in the Province of Massachusetts Bay and served in the First United States Congress.

His son, Jonathan Grout Jr., built the first optical telegraph in the United States, connecting Martha's Vineyard and Boston.

A descendant of his was Edward M. Grout (1861–1931), a lawyer and New York City Comptroller.

References

1737 births
1807 deaths
Members of the United States House of Representatives from Massachusetts
People from Lunenburg, Massachusetts